Čížkov is a municipality and village in Plzeň-South District in the Plzeň Region of the Czech Republic. It has about 600 inhabitants.

Administrative parts
Villages of Čečovice, Chynín, Liškov, Měrčín, Přešín, Zahrádka and Železný Újezd are administrative parts of Čížkov.

References

Villages in Plzeň-South District